Fotios "Frank" Klopas (born September 1, 1966) is an American former soccer player who played as a forward. Following his retirement, he served as a color commentator for the Chicago Fire before later working as a front office executive and head coach for both the Fire and Montreal Impact. He is currently an assistant coach for the Chicago Fire.

Club career

Early years
Klopas emigrated to the United States from Prosymna, Peloponnese, Greece when he was eight years old and received U.S. citizenship on his 18th birthday. He and his family settled in Chicago, where he attended and played boys soccer, at Mather High School, which he led to the Chicago Public League championship his senior year.

Professional career
In 1983, he signed with the Chicago Sting of the North American Soccer League straight out of high school, but an injury led to him missing the team's final outdoor season. Klopas would play for the indoor Sting in the MISL for four seasons. He earned second team All Star honors during the 1986–1987 season.

In 1988, Klopas moved to Greece to play with AEK Athens. He played four seasons with the team. However, he tore his anterior cruciate ligament in 1991. That injury and a subsequent infection hindered his playing for nearly two years. In 1992, Klopas signed a contract with the U.S. Soccer Federation to play full-time for the United States men's national soccer team. After the 1994 FIFA World Cup, Klopas returned to Greece and signed with Apollon Athens in 1994 for the remainder of the 1994–1995 season, as well as the 1995–1996 season. He debuted with Apollon against his former club, AEK. In 1996, Major League Soccer began developing teams for its inaugural season. In order to ensure an equitable distribution of talent to each team, MLS allocated known players to each team. MLS allocated Klopas to the Kansas City Wizards where he would spend two years. After being sent to the Columbus Crew just before the 1997 MLS Expansion Draft, he was traded in February 1998 to the Chicago Fire for Jason Farrell, who had been selected from the Crew. Klopas would play two years for Chicago before retiring, helping them to the MLS Cup in 1998 and the U.S. Open Cup to complete "The Double." In four years in MLS, Klopas scored 13 goals and added 16 assists. He had six goals and five assists in 40 games—24 starts—for the Fire, including both goals in a 2–0 win over the Tampa Bay Mutiny in the Fire's first ever game at Soldier Field on April 4, 1998. Klopas' most notable goal for the Fire came in Golden Goal overtime of a 2–1 win over the Columbus Crew in the 1998 U.S. Open Cup Final at Soldier Field.

Klopas retired following the 1999 season. He was inducted into Chicago's "Ring of Fire," which celebrates outstanding players and contributors to the organization, in 2004. He was inducted into the Illinois Soccer Hall of Fame in 2005.

International career
Klopas made his debut for the U.S. national team in 1987, coming on in a 2–0 Olympic Qualifying loss at Canada on 23 May. Though this was technically his debut for the team, it isn't counted among his senior national team caps as Olympic play is not considered to be of full international status by FIFA even though many of the players that made up the side were full national team players. Klopas was also on the U.S. team at the 1987 Pan American Games. In total, Klopas earned five Olympic team appearances, scoring one goal in a 4–2 qualifying win at El Salvador on October 18, 1987 and helping the team qualify for the 1988 Olympics. Klopas would start and play the full 90 minutes in a 0–0 draw with hosts South Korea and a 4–2 loss to the Soviet Union as the U.S. failed to advance from their group.

Klopas made his full senior team debut when he came on as a halftime substitute for Chico Borja in a 2–0 friendly loss to Colombia in Miami on May 14, 1988. He scored his first two international goals in a 5–1 defeat of Jamaica in St. Louis in the second leg of a home-and-home World Cup qualifying series on August 13, 1988. Despite appearing in seven of 10 U.S. World Cup qualifiers for the 1990 FIFA World Cup, Klopas did not make the trip to the team's 1–0 clinching victory over Trinidad & Tobago on November 19, 1989 because head coach Bob Gansler didn't think he was fit enough. Subsequently, he was not included among the 22-man U.S. squad that went to Italy for the tournament.

Injuries and the fact that he was playing abroad in Greece at a time when the National Team was run like a club team limited Klopas to just three caps between 1990–1993. In early 1994, Klopas returned from surgery on his anterior cruciate ligament and began working towards a place on the hosting U.S. side's roster for the 1994 FIFA World Cup. Under the guidance of Bora Milutinovic, the U.S. team took on a conservative, defensive approach in the lead-up to the tournament which was also predicated upon the fact that the side didn't have a lot of offensive weapons. Klopas returned to the national team on February 18, coming on as a halftime substitute for Joe-Max Moore in a 1–1 draw with Bolivia in Miami. Over the next few months, he continued to build his fitness up and scored his third international goal in the team's 3–0 friendly win over Moldova on April 20 in Davidson, N.C.

Klopas would go on to score five goals in the eight international friendlies the U.S. played immediately prior to the start of the World Cup, tallying against Iceland, Estonia, Armenia and his native Greece. He also scored a brace in a pre-World Cup friendly against Bundesliga champions Bayern Munich on May 22, 1994 and went on to make the U.S. roster.

Despite his recent strike rate, Klopas was left out of the starting 11 for the American's historic 1–1 draw vs. Switzerland and didn't appear in their opening match of the tournament played June 18 at the Pontiac Silverdome. Four days later, Klopas again didn't see the field as the U.S. upset pre-tournament favorites Colombia 2–1 at The Rose Bowl in Pasadena, Calif, putting the team in a great position to advance to the second round. With the U.S. team earning four of a possible six points from their first two matches, Milutinovic only made one lineup change throughout the group stage. The U.S. team's lack of offense was exposed in the group finale vs. Romania, falling 1–0 but still finishing as one of the tournament's best third place teams, which allowed them to advance to a Round of 16 date with Brazil on July 4.

After the lack of scoring chances created against Romania, Milutinovic's decision not to play Klopas was brought into question the day before the Knockout Round match, to which the Serbian manager said, "He can score, but what else?". Klopas responded to Milutinovic's assessment of his play saying, "He said that? I don't know why he would feel that way. I can play wherever he needs me to play. This is the only time I've actually played striker. My five years in Greece, I played midfield and attacker. I'll play any position the team needs me to play. Where I am now, it's not my duty to defend."

Despite the suspension of starting midfielder John Harkes for the Brazil game and Tab Ramos leaving the game in the first half after catching an elbow from left back Leonardo, Klopas was not used in the match as Hugo Perez replaced Harkes in the starting lineup and Eric Wynalda came on for Ramos. The U.S. held well defensively but were undone by Bebeto's 72nd-minute strike and fell 1–0 to the eventual champions at Stanford Stadium.

Despite not playing in the team's four biggest matches of the year, Klopas played in the team's remaining four friendlies in 1994 and scored three more goals to finish as the U.S. team's top goal scorer that year, tallying eight goals in 15 appearances.

Klopas' swan song with the U.S. team came the following year when he was named to the roster for the 1995 Copa América. He would appear in five of the team's six games and scored the first goal in a 3–0 shocker over Argentina on July 14, 1995, one of the biggest upsets in U.S. Soccer history. He also scored the game-winning goal in the penalty shootout against Mexico in the quarterfinals three days later. Just over a year after being knocked out of the World Cup, the Brazilians were once again responsible for the U.S. team's exit, sending them to a 1–0 semifinal defeat on July 20 in Maldonado, Uruguay. Klopas played in the team's final two friendlies that year, with his final appearance for the U.S. coming as an 80th-minute substitute for Tab Ramos in a 4–3 win over Saudi Arabia on October 8, 1995 in Washington, D.C.

From 1988–1995, Klopas amassed 39 senior international caps, scoring 12 goals. At the end of 1995, Klopas sat fourth on the U.S. all-time goal scoring list behind Bruce Murray, Eric Wynalda and Hugo Perez. He now sits 16th on the list and along with Bobby Wood jointly holds the distinction as the U.S. players with the most goals scored without appearing in a FIFA World Cup match.

Managerial career
In 2000, the Chicago Fire hired Klopas as the team's strength and conditioning trainer. After the 2000 MLS season, he resigned due to personal reasons. In 2004, he was named the head coach and general manager of MISL's expansion franchise Chicago Storm. He led the team to a playoff berth in its second season but resigned in July 2006. In January 2008, he was named the first technical director for the Fire. He was appointed the Fire's interim head coach following the dismissal of Carlos de los Cobos in May 2011. Klopas earned his first MLS win as coach in a 1–0 victory over the Columbus Crew thirteen days later on June 12. The Fire finished the season 8–5–10 under Klopas, just missing the playoffs. He coached the Fire through the following two seasons before stepping down after the 2013 season.

In December 2013, he was named head coach and director of player personnel of the Montreal Impact. After a string of poor performances, he was formally relieved of his duties in late August 2015, and replaced on an interim basis by Mauro Biello.

Personal life
Klopas lives in Chicago with his wife, Sophia.

Player statistics

International Appearances

As of match played October 8, 1995.

International goals

Coaching statistics

Honors

As a player
Chicago Sting
NASL Championship: 1984

AEK Athens
Alpha Ethniki: 1988–89, 1991–92, 1992–93, 1993–94
Greek Super Cup: 1989
Greek League Cup: 1990

Chicago Fire
MLS Cup: 1998
U.S. Open Cup: 1998

As a coach
Montreal Impact
Canadian Championship: 2014

References

External links
Chicago Fire official bio

1966 births
Living people
People from Argos-Mykines
Greek emigrants to the United States
United States men's international soccer players
Chicago Sting (MISL) players
Major Indoor Soccer League (1978–1992) players
Major League Soccer players
Super League Greece players
AEK Athens F.C. players
Apollon Smyrnis F.C. players
Sporting Kansas City players
Chicago Fire FC players
Pan American Games competitors for the United States
Footballers at the 1987 Pan American Games
Olympic soccer players of the United States
Footballers at the 1988 Summer Olympics
1994 FIFA World Cup players
1995 Copa América players
1996 CONCACAF Gold Cup players
American soccer players
American expatriate soccer players
American soccer coaches
Chicago Fire FC coaches
CF Montréal coaches
Soccer players from Illinois
Major Indoor Soccer League (2001–2008) coaches
Major League Soccer coaches
Expatriate footballers in Greece
Expatriate soccer managers in Canada
Chicago Fire FC non-playing staff
Association football forwards
Mather High School alumni
Footballers from the Peloponnese